"Au Privave" is a bebop jazz standard composed by Charlie Parker in 1951. Parker recorded "Au Privave" on January 17, 1951, for the American record label Verve. From French, the title translates to "in Privave" or "at the Privave." A variant of this title is "Après Vous" (After You), a song recorded by drummer Max Roach.

See also
List of post-1950 jazz standards

References

External links

1950s jazz standards
1951 songs
Compositions by Charlie Parker
Bebop jazz standards
Jazz compositions in F major